The 2005 FIVB Girls Youth Volleyball World Championship was held in Macau from 23 to 31 July 2005. 16 teams participated in the tournament, and was won by Brazil.

Qualification process

 * Austria replaced Germany.

Pools composition

First round

Pool A

|}

|}

Pool B

|}

|}

Pool C

|}

|}

Pool D

|}

|}

Second round

Play off – elimination group

|}

Play off – seeding group

|}

Final round

Quarterfinals

|}

5th–8th semifinals

|}

Semifinals

|}

7th place

|}

5th place

|}

3rd place

|}

Final

|}

Final standing

Individual awards

Most Valuable Player

Best Scorer

Best Spiker

Best Blocker

Best Server

Best Digger

Best Setter

Best Receiver

References

World Championship
2005 in Macau sport
FIVB Volleyball Girls' U18 World Championship
Macau